IWC International Watch Co. AG, also known as IWC Schaffhausen, is a Swiss watch manufacturer located in Schaffhausen, Switzerland. Originally founded by American watchmaker Florentine Ariosto Jones in 1868, IWC has been a subsidiary of the Swiss Richemont Group since 2000.

IWC is best known for producing luxury pilot/aviation watches and using titanium in watchmaking. In 2018 IWC was recognized by the WWF for its environmental efforts and received an "Ambitious" rating; placing first amongst fifteen other Swiss watchmakers.

History

Creation

In 1868,  American engineer and watchmaker Florentine Ariosto Jones (1841–1916), who had been a director of E. Howard & Co., in Boston founded the International Watch Company. He planned to assemble watches in Switzerland and import them into the United States. At the time, wages in Switzerland were relatively low although there was a ready supply of skilled watchmaking labor, mainly carried out by people in their homes.  Jones encountered opposition to his plans in French-speaking Switzerland because Jones wanted to open a factory.

In 1850 the town of Schaffhausen was in danger of being left behind in the Industrial Age. At this stage, watch manufacturer and industrialist Heinrich Moser built Schaffhausen's first hydroelectric plant and aided in further industrialization.  He met F.A. Jones in Le Locle and showed great interest in his plans.  Together, they laid the foundations for the only watch manufacturers in north-eastern Switzerland. The brand was previously known as the International Watch Chronology.

Early stages and bankruptcy

In 1869 F.A. Jones rented the first factory premises in an industrial building owned by J.H. Moser at the Rheinstrasse. Having to rent further rooms in the Oberhaus By 1874 plans were already being made for a new factory and a site was purchased from Moser's hydroelectric company. Schaffhausen architect, G. Meyer, won the order to design and build the factory. A year later, in the spring of 1875, the construction work was completed.  At first, 196 people worked in the 45 meter long factory, which could accommodate up to 300 workplaces. However, F.A Jones had trouble selling the watches in America due to tariffs, financing, and technical machine problems. By 1875, stockholders alleged that the company was on the verge of collapse, and Jones scrambled to find new investors. The company eventually filed for bankruptcy, and Jones was forced to relinquish control of the company.

IWC and the Rauschenbach family
One of IWC's stockholders, Johann Rauschenbach-Vogel, Chief Executive Officer and a machine manufacturer from Schaffhausen, took over the Internationale Uhrenfabrik on 17 February 1880. He purchased the company for 280,000 francs.  Four generations of the Rauschenbach family owned IWC, with varying names.
Only a year after the sale, Johannes Rauschenbach died. His son, Johannes Rauschenbach-Schenk, aged 25, took over the Uhrenfabrik von J. Rauschenbach and ran it successfully until his own death on 2 March 1905.

AUrs Haenggi from Nunningen in the canton of Solothurn had got to know the watch business in French-speaking Switzerland and France; in 1883 he joined IWC and stayed with the company for 52 years. He was responsible for getting factory operations up and running smoothly and acquiring new customers. He was also responsible for warding off the prospect of the outside interests acquiring IWC "in the interest of the noble Rauschenbach family".

After the death of J. Rauschenbach-Schenk in 1905, his wife, two daughters, Bertha Marguerite Rauschenbach and Emma Rauschenbach (later Jung), and their husbands, Ernst Jakob Homberger (director of G. Fischer AG in Schaffhausen) and Carl Gustav Jung, took over the watch factory as an open trading company named as the Uhrenfabrik von J. Rauschenbach's Erben - watch manufacturer of the heirs of J. Rauschenbach. E.J. Homberger was the only authorized signatory, Haenggi and Vogel were directors.

Following the death of his father-in-law, Ernst Jakob Homberger had a considerable influence on the Schaffhausen watchmaking company's affairs and guided it through one of the most turbulent epochs in Europe's history. Just before the world economic crisis, he took over as sole proprietor and renamed the company Uhrenfabrik von Ernst Homberger-Rauschenbach, formerly International Watch Co. His contribution was honoured in 1952, when he was awarded an honorary doctorate by the University of St. Gallen. He died in 1955, aged 85 years.

Hans Homberger was the third and last of the Rauschenbach heirs to run the factory as a sole proprietor. He had joined his father's company in 1934 and took control after his death in April 1955. In 1957 he added a new wing to the factory and in the same year set up a modern pension fund for the staff.  He bought new machines to meet new demands and continuously brought his production technology up to what were considered the latest standards. He died in 1986 at the age of 77.

Prominent technicians
Technician Johann Vogel from Wangen an der Aare in Solothurn played an important role as technical director. He designed and developed IWC calibers until 1919.

In 1885, IWC manufactured the first digital watch based on a patent granted to an Austrian by the name of Pallweber. It was a simple design, but was unable to replace the traditional analogue display.

Electrical era
In 1888 electricity began to take over at the watch factory. J. Rauschenbach had a powerline installed which supplied it with electricity. Shortly before the turn of the century, the company started converting its production machines to electricity.  An electric motor made by Brown, Boveri & Co. from Baden powered the engines in the factory. These were later replaced during the 1930s with individually powered machines.

1900-1960
During the period just before and after the First World War, E.J. Homberger established many social institutions.  He extended the living quarters for factory employees and established a fund for widows and orphans. In 1929, the name of the fund was changed to the J. Rauschenbach Foundation and in 1949 he founded the Watch Company Welfare Foundation. Germany's military buildup of the 1930s brought the demand for precision watches back to Glashütte. From the second half of the thirties to the end of World War II, IWC was one of five watch manufacturers (the others being Stowa, Laco, Wempe and A. Lange & Söhne) that built B-Uhren for Germany's air force (Luftwaffe).

On 1 April 1944, Schaffhausen was bombed by the United States Army Air Forces. The watch factory was hit by a bomb which failed to detonate after crashing through the rafters. The flames from incendiaries exploding nearby penetrated the building through the broken windows but were extinguished by the company's own fire brigade.

After World War II, IWC was forced to change its focus. All of Eastern Europe had fallen under the Iron Curtain, and the economy of Germany was in shambles. As a result, old contacts and connections with other countries in Europe and the Americas as well as Australia and the Far East were revived and intensified or established.

In the mid century, IWC rolled out its famed Caliber 89 movement. This mechanically-wound movement powered IWC models from the 1940s until the early 1990s.

1970s - present

In the 1970s and 80s, due to the quartz crisis, the Swiss watchmaking industry underwent a phase of far-reaching technological change. The era saw the first  use of miniaturized electric batteries as a source of energy for wristwatches and some eventually unsuccessful technologies, such as the electronically controlled balance.  The Uhrenfabrik H. E. Homberger co-founded and was a shareholder in the Centre Électronique Horloger (CEH) in Neuchâtel and was financially involved in the development of the Beta 21 quartz wristwatch movement, which was first presented to the public at the 1969 Industrial Fair in Basel and used by other manufactures such as the Omega Electroquartz watches. In value terms, this movement accounted for about 5-6% of total sales of quartz watches. Parallel to this, the company expanded its collection of jeweller watches to include ladies watches with mechanical movements. 1973 was IWC's most successful year of the post-war period.

A rise in gold prices in 1974 had grave consequences for the watch exporting industry. Between 1970 and 1974 the price of gold rose from 4,850 to 18,000 francs and the value of the US dollar against the Swiss currency fell by up to 40%. As a result, the price of watch exports rose by as much as 250%.

A change of direction was necessary, and this led to the adoption of a number of measures. In order to survive, IWC, under the leadership of Director and CEO Otto Heller, built up a line of pocket watches, and, apart from setting up its own modern wristwatch and case manufacturing facilities, began working closely with Ferdinand A. Porsche as an external designer. In addition, IWC pioneered new watchmaking technologies, notably the first titanium bracelets, developed in 1978.

For its new plans, IWC required a high level of venture capital. With the help of the Swiss Bank Corporation, the company was put in contact with VDO Adolf Schindling AG, which took a majority interest in IWC in 1978.

At the same time, IWC reacquired the name it had originally been given by its founder F.A. Jones (International Watch Co. AG).

In 1981, Kawal Singh succeeded H.E. Homberger as general manager following the latter's retirement. The new director, Günter Blümlein, pushed for rapid implementation of planned changes, put the existing advertising campaign to work, built up the customer base and solidified IWC's finances.

In 1985 IWC then Director Günter Blümlein asked Kurt Klaus to create a Grande Complication watch to be worn on a wrist, as existing iterations on the market are all much larger sized Pocket Watch. In 1986, Manufacture d'Horlogerie Renaud et Papi SA's founders Dominic Renaud and Giulio Papi assisted the design of the repeater function of the movement, before their take over by Audemars Piguet in 1992.

The IWC ref.3770 launched in 1990 was the first wristwatch-sized Grande Complication that housed a Chronograph, a Minute Repeater and a Perpetual Calendar functions.

In 1991 IWC director Günter Blümlein founded the LMH Group with its headquarters in Schaffhausen. With a 100% stake in IWC, 60% in Jaeger-LeCoultre (the other 40% was owned by Audemars Piguet), and 90% in the Saxony-based watchmaking company of A. Lange & Söhne. The Group employed some 1,440 persons.

In July 2000, LMH was acquired by Richemont for CHF 2.8 billion. Despite the takeover by Richemont, IWC was guaranteed that it would continue to be managed by the same executives from the LMH Group.

In 2001 IWC went online with the Collectors Forum.

In 2011, IWC released its other Grande Complication watch, Sidérale Scafusia, taking 10 years to develop. The watch has a Celestial Chart with sunrise and sunset indications customized for each customer based on their individual locations.

In 2021, IWC CEO Christoph Grainger used a PORTL device to appear at the Watches & Wonders fair in Shanghai.

Motto and slogan
IWC's motto is Probus Scafusia, a Latin phrase meaning "good, solid craftsmanship from Schaffhausen". The motto was established in 1903.

Watch manufacturing

Production records

The company began keeping detailed records for each watch that has left the factory since 1885. Since 1885, details of the caliber, materials used and cases have been entered into the records. In the case of later models, these also include the reference number, delivery date and the name of the authorized dealer.  For a small fee, the owner can obtain precise information about their watch, as long as the watch is at least ten years old.

The company claims that its service department has the parts and is capable of repairing and maintaining watches from every era since IWC's foundation in 1868.

IWC movements
Manufacture in-house movements include the Caliber 50000/52000, Caliber 80000/82000/89000, which feature the Pellaton winding system, using pawls rather than direct gearing between the rotor and barrel, and the pocket watch movements used in the Portuguese F.A. Jones and other IWC pocket watches. Caliber 59000 is an in-house hand-wound movement which consist of Moonphase or Tourbillon complications. Caliber 94000 consist of IWC's patented Constant Force Tourbillon mechanism.

In response to ETA SA's cut in supply of ébauche movements, IWC developed their new manufacture automatic and chronograph movements, Caliber 32000, Caliber 69000 as in-house designed replacements and are widely used in the Pilot, Portuguese and Ingenieur collections. Richemont Group's Montblanc MB 25.10 movement was also based on IWC's 69370.

In the bulk of IWC's lower range watches significant modifications are made to the Sellita SW300 by IWC at the manufacture to create the automatic Caliber 35111.

Environmental rating 

In December 2018, World Wide Fund for Nature (WWF) released an official report giving environmental ratings for 15 major watch manufacturers and jewelers in Switzerland. IWC received a high rating as "Ambitious" and was ranked No. 1 among the 15 manufacturers. Being the only manufacturer examined to receive this raiting. IWC was reported to have shown a "serious commitment towards a sustainable transformation, but with substantial potential for improvement". Since early 2000s, IWC has been actively engaged in environmental protection and sustainable development. In 2018, IWC published a sustainability report based on the global best-practice standards of the Global Reporting Initiative (GRI).

In jewelry and watchmaking industry, there are general concerns over the lack of transparency in manufacturing activities and the sourcing of precious raw materials such as gold, which is a major cause of environmental issues such as pollution, soil degradation and deforestation. The situation is especially serious in the developing countries which are top producers of gold, including China, Russia and South Africa. It is estimated that the watch and jewelry sector uses over 50% of world's annual gold production (over 2,000 tons), but in most cases the watch companies are not able to or are unwilling to demonstrate where their raw materials come from and if the material suppliers use eco-friendly sourcing technologies.

Charity auction

Since 1997, IWC has been offering a horological item for online auction annually on its website, donating proceeds  to the Ecole des Sables – Antoine de Saint Exupéry school in Mali. The school provides education for Tuareg children.

In 2007, the Company auctioned a platinum version of the Pilot's Watch Automatic Edition Antoine de Saint Exupéry, Reference 3201. The watch was made as a tribute to the French author and aviation pioneer. It was auctioned together with an original copy of Exupery's debut novel, Courrier Sud (Southern Mail), featuring a handwritten dedication by the author. In 2009 IWC introduced the Big Pilot edition Antoine de Saint Exupéry in 1,900 pieces. Only one of them will be in platinum and will be auctioned for charity.

Watch International
Four times a year, IWC publishes a customer magazine, Watch International. This publication is available in German, French, and English.  The  magazine includes feature stories about IWC, and other articles.

See also 

 List of watch manufacturers

References

External links

 Official website
 History of the IWC Portuguese

Watch manufacturing companies of Switzerland
Richemont brands
Luxury brands
Manufacturing companies established in 1868
Swiss companies established in 1868
Swiss watch brands
Schaffhausen